Luke Morley (born 19 June 1960 in Camberwell, London, England) is the guitarist, chief songwriter and producer for the hard rock band Thunder from 1989 to present (with a break from 1999–2002, and 2009–2011).  Previous to that he was a member of 1980s group, Terraplane who subsequently became Thunder.

In 2009, when Thunder announced that they were splitting up, Luke became the lead guitarist and co-songwriter for the rock band The Union, which he formed with guitarist and co-songwriter, Peter Shoulder.

Equipment

Guitars
Morley regularly plays the following guitars.
 Black Les Paul Traditional
 White Les Paul Custom (studio + live)
 White Fender Telecaster (studio + live)
 Burgundy Fender Stratocaster (studio)
 Ovation Balladeer acoustic (studio)
 Takamine Acoustic (studio + live)
 Gibson Flying V (live)

Other guitars in his collection.
 Gibson EDS-1275

Amps
 Marshall Vintage Modern

Harmonicas
 Hohner Blues or Cross Harp

Discography

Studio albums
With Terraplane 
 Black and White (1985)
 Moving Target (1987)
With Thunder
 Backstreet Symphony (1990)
 Laughing on Judgement Day (1992)
 Behind Closed Doors (1995)
 The Thrill of It All (1997)
 Giving the Game Away (1999)
 Shooting at the Sun (2002)
 The Magnificent Seventh (2005)
 Robert Johnson's Tombstone (2006)
 Bang! (2008)
 Wonder Days (2015)
 Rip It Up (2017)
E.P recorded with Andy Taylor of Duran Duran
The Spanish Sessions

Solo
 El Gringo Retro (2001)

Bowes & Morley
 Moving Swiftly Along (2002)
 Mo's Barbeque (2004)

The Union
 The Union (2010)
 Siren's Song (2011)
 The World Is Yours (2013)

References

External links
 The Union Official Website
 
 Thunder Official Website

 

People educated at Haberdashers' Boys' School
Living people
1960 births
People from Camberwell
English songwriters
English heavy metal guitarists
English rock guitarists
The Power Station (band) members
Thunder (band) members